Top Country Albums is a chart that ranks the top-performing country music albums in the United States, published by Billboard.  In 1978, eight different albums topped the chart, which was at the time published under the title Top Country LP's, based on sales reports submitted by a representative sample of stores nationwide.

In the issue of Billboard dated January 7, Dolly Parton was at number one with her album Here You Come Again, its third week in the top spot.  The album remained at number one through the issue dated February 18 for a final total of nine weeks atop the chart.  Parton would return to the top of the listing in September with Heartbreaker, which also spent nine consecutive weeks at number one.  At the time, Parton's music was increasingly being targeted at the pop music market; Heartbreaker in particular was more pop-focused than her previous recordings and two of its tracks even received disco remixes which were popular in nightclubs.  Dottie West was the only other female artist to reach number one during the year, when she collaborated with Kenny Rogers on Every Time Two Fools Collide, which topped the listing in May.  West had first entered the country albums chart in 1965 but had never previously reached number one, and indeed had not entered the top ten for over a decade, but her collaboration with the popular Rogers gave her her first chart-topping album as well as her first number one on the country singles chart.

In March, Waylon Jennings and Willie Nelson topped the chart with their collaborative album Waylon & Willie, which spent 11 non-consecutive weeks at number one.  The two artists were among the most prominent members of the outlaw country movement, which rejected the slick production values evident in popular country music of the early 1970s and added a rock music influence and a counterculture attitude.  Both singers also had solo number ones during the year.  In June, Nelson displaced the joint album from the top spot with his solo release Stardust.  The album was an unexpected departure for Nelson, as it consisted entirely of pop standards and incorporated pop and jazz styles, in contrast to his outlaw country recordings.  Executives at his record label were convinced that making the album was a bad decision on the part of Nelson, but it went on to become a multi-million seller and remain on the country albums chart for more than ten years.  It would ultimately be certified quintuple platinum by the Recording Industry Association of America.  Nelson's fellow outlaw artist Jennings had the final chart-topper of 1978 with I've Always Been Crazy, which spent the last eight weeks of the year at number one.

Chart history

References

1978-related lists
1978 Top Country LP
1978 record charts